Culpinia is a genus of moths in the family Geometridae.

Species
 Culpinia diffusa (Walker, 1861)

References
 Culpinia at Markku Savela's Lepidoptera and Some Other Life Forms
 Natural History Museum Lepidoptera genus database

Hemitheini